Bay School District is a public school district based in Craighead County, Arkansas, United States, with its headquarters in Bay. According to the official website, the Bay School District, located in northeastern Arkansas, was established in 1897. The district has an area of over 65 square miles, bordering Brookland, Riverside, Nettleton, and Valley View School Districts in Craighead County, and Trumann School District in Poinsett County.  The Bay School District has one elementary school (K–6) and one high school (7–12), and the district has been NCA accredited since 1990.

In addition to Bay, the district includes portions of the city limits of Jonesboro.

References

External links

 

Education in Craighead County, Arkansas
School districts in Arkansas
1897 establishments in Arkansas
School districts established in 1897
Jonesboro, Arkansas